Satoshi Motoyama (本山哲 - Motoyama Satoshi; born March 4, 1971) is a Japanese professional racing driver and team manager. He is best known for racing in the Super GT Series, formerly known as the All-Japan Grand Touring Car Championship (JGTC) as a factory driver for Nissan, and for racing in the Formula Nippon Championship (now known as the Super Formula Championship). He is a three-time champion of the GT500 class of Super GT, and a four-time Formula Nippon/Super Formula champion, making him one of the most successful Japanese racing drivers of all-time.

Career

Early life and career 
Born in Tokyo, Japan, Motoyama began his karting career at 13 years old in 1984. He won the A1 class All-Japan Karting Championship in 1986, and the A2 class titles in 1987 and 1989.

Motoyama graduated from karts in 1990, taking part in the All-Japan Formula Three Championship. Motoyama enjoyed only limited success over his first three seasons, and in 1993 and 1994 he struggled to secure sponsorship and raced only part-time in the series. In 1995, Motoyama signed with Dome Racing and finished second in the championship to Pedro de la Rosa, winning one race as De la Rosa took victories in the other eight races that season.

Motoyama raced in the Japanese Touring Car Championship (JTCC) from 1995 to 1997 during the Super Touring era. In 1997, Motoyama won three races and finished third in the championship driving for Nismo. But the season-ending race at Fuji Speedway was marred by controversy, when after he was hit by championship rival Osamu Nakako, Motoyama returned to the track and intentionally spun Nakako out and into the protective sponge barriers at the 100R corner. Motoyama was suspended for the final round of that year's Formula Nippon championship and the JGTC All-Star Race at Twin Ring Motegi, and fined ¥500,000.

JGTC/Super GT (1996-2018) 
Motoyama made his debut in the All-Japan GT Championship in the third round of the 1996 season at Sendai Hi-Land Raceway, driving a GT300 class Nissan Silvia S14 owned by Kazuyoshi Hoshino. He took GT300 class pole position in his debut race, and also scored pole position in the fifth round at Sportsland Sugo.

For the 1997 season, Motoyama stepped up to the premier GT500 class, driving alongside Hoshino in the Calsonic Nissan Skyline GT-R for Team Impul. Motoyama switched teams for the 1998 season, partnering up with Aguri Suzuki and the new Autobacs Racing Team Aguri squad and co-driver Takeshi Tsuchiya. Motoyama finished 11th in the 1997 standings, and 12th in 1998.

In 1999, Motoyama, who had just won his first Formula Nippon championship, was promoted to the reigning champions at Nismo, driving the Pennzoil Skyline GT-R alongside defending series champion and Formula 1 veteran Érik Comas. In the fourth round of the season, Motoyama scored his first career GT500 victory at the Central Park Miné Circuit. Motoyama scored four podium finishes in total, and finished third in the Drivers' Championship as Comas went on to win his second straight GT500 title. Motoyama only missed the second round of the 1999 season at Fuji Speedway, as he was participating in a pre-qualifying session for the 24 Hours of Le Mans that same day. Motoyama moved back to Calsonic Team Impul in 2000, and had another solid year that included a second career win at Miné in the penultimate round of the year. He once again finished third in the championship with co-driver Hoshino.

In 2002, Motoyama moved back to Nismo having won his second Formula Nippon title. His new co-driver was German driver Michael Krumm. Motoyama and Krumm renewed their partnership in 2003 after a disappointing 2002 season, scoring points in all seven rounds that year, and podium finishes at TI Circuit Aida, Sugo, Fuji, and Suzuka Circuit. Despite not winning a race, Motoyama and Krumm's consistency in the #23 Xanavi Skyline GT-R was enough for them to become GT500 champions, clinching the championship with a third-place finish at Suzuka. By winning his first JGTC title, and the Formula Nippon title earlier in the year, Motoyama became only the second driver to win both championships in the same calendar year, joining 1997 "double champion" Pedro de la Rosa.

Motoyama was given a new car for his 2004 title defense, the new Nissan Fairlady Z33, which succeeded the Skyline GT-R as Nissan's flagship GT500 car. He also had a new co-driver in Richard Lyons. In their first race together at Nismo, and the first race for the new Nissan Z, Motoyama ended a four-year winless drought by winning the opening round at TI Circuit. Taking podium finishes at Sepang International Circuit and Twin Ring Motegi, plus a second win at the Autopolis circuit, Motoyama won back-to-back GT500 championships with Nismo. Motoyama won one race in each of the next three seasons, and continued to compete for championships in 2005 and in 2006, finishing third and sixth in the standings respectively.

2008 saw the introduction of the new R35 Nissan GT-R as Nissan's GT500 challenger, and Motoyama continued on with Nismo, with new co-driver Benoît Tréluyer. The duo led a 1-2 finish in the GT-R's Super GT debut at the opening round at Suzuka. They followed that up with a win at Okayama International Circuit, taking back-to-back wins to open the year. Though they struggled through the next few rounds with heavy success ballast, Motoyama and Tréluyer won their third race of the year at Autopolis, and went on to win the championship - making Motoyama the first three-time GT500 champion. Motoyama and Tréluyer won twice in 2009, at Fuji and at Sugo. The victory at Sugo was Motoyama's 12th career GT500 win, moving him ahead of Yuji Tachikawa for the all-time wins record. In 2010, Motoyama and Tréluyer failed to win a race for the first time, coming as close as two second-place finishes at Sepang, and at the Suzuka Summer Special in August.

In the final year of Motoyama and Tréluyer's partnership at Nismo, they won three races, at Fuji, Autopolis, and Motegi, and finished runner-up in the GT500 championship. The win at Autopolis was notable for Motoyama sprinting from 12th on the grid to the lead of the race in just 26 laps, in a race that they needed to win in order to keep their championship hopes alive going into the Motegi finale.

After switching from Nismo to two-time reigning GT500 champions MOLA in 2013, Motoyama claimed his last victory in the 2015 Buriram Super GT Race held at Chang International Circuit. At Sugo, he took his final career pole position. Reigning Blancpain GT Series Endurance Cup champion Katsumasa Chiyo joined Motoyama at MOLA for the 2016 season, and the duo scored a podium finish on debut at Okayama, and another podium finish that year in the Suzuka 1000 km, with Mitsunori Takaboshi replacing an injured Chiyo. At the fourth round of the 2017 season at Sugo, Motoyama took his final Super GT podium finish with a second place, notable for Motoyama's battle on the final corners of the final lap with Kohei Hirate. Motoyama and Chiyo remained together for 2018, this time driving for NDDP Racing with B-Max, who took over MOLA's entry in GT500. Motoyama drove his final race as a GT500 driver on November 11, 2018, at Twin Ring Motegi, finishing 9th.

On 10 February, 2019, Motoyama announced his retirement as a Nissan GT500 driver. He became an Executive Advisor to Nissan's factory GT500 programme that same year.

Formula Nippon (1996-2008) 
Motoyama made his debut in the Formula Nippon Championship in 1996, driving for first-year team owner Aguri Suzuki and the new Funai Super Aguri team. He scored his first podium finish in the sixth round of the season at Sportsland Sugo, and started on the front row in the final round at Fuji Speedway before he was involved in a multi-car pileup on the first lap. He finished 10th in the championship in 1996 and 11th in 1997.

For 1998, Motoyama moved to Team Le Mans. He took his first career win at the second round at Central Park Miné Circuit, and his second win in the following round at Fuji, where he also recorded his first pole position. He won his third race at Miné in the eighth round of the season, and clinched his first Formula Nippon championship with a second-place finish in the penultimate round at Fuji. Motoyama returned to Team Le Mans the following year in 1999, taking another three victories and three pole positions. He went on to finish second in the championship standings to Tom Coronel.

In 2000, Motoyama changed teams to Team Impul, driving for Kazuyoshi Hoshino as he did in the JGTC. Motoyama finished a distant third in the championship behind Toranosuke Takagi, taking one win, two poles, and four podiums in the final four races. The 2001 season started with Motoyama taking three pole positions through the first four rounds, and a victory at Miné, but two retirements and a non-scoring finish saw him trail championship leader Naoki Hattori by 22 points after four races. However, Motoyama took victories in three of the following four rounds, taking the championship lead as Hattori began to struggle, and eventually clinching his second Formula Nippon title with a second-place finish at Motegi. In 2002, the first year in which Formula Nippon went to a spec chassis, Motoyama had another fantastic season, winning five out of the ten races that season. Despite winning more races than any other driver that year, Motoyama would end up losing the championship by just two points to Ralph Firman.

The 2003 season began with success and tragedy. Motoyama won the opening round at Suzuka Circuit, and won the following round at Fuji. Motoyama was unable to celebrate his win at Fuji, however, after he learned of his childhood friend Daijiro Kato suffering critical injuries in a crash during the 2003 MotoGP World Championship round at Suzuka. On April 27, a week after Kato died of his injuries, Motoyama took his third consecutive win of the season at Miné. Motoyama took another victory in the sixth round at Sugo, and despite a late surge from his Impul teammate Benoît Tréluyer, Motoyama was able to clinch his third championship with a second-place finish in the penultimate round at Motegi. He joined his mentor Kazuyoshi Hoshino and former F1 driver Satoru Nakajima as only the third driver to win three or more Japanese top formula championships, and was the first driver in the Formula Nippon era to win three championships.

After testing for the Renault and Jordan Formula 1 teams in hopes of landing a race set, Motoyama returned to Formula Nippon in 2004, switching teams to Team 5ZIGEN. Motoyama only won once, in the sixth round of the season at Sugo, and finished sixth in the championship - his worst result since 1997. For 2005, Motoyama secured a transfer back to Team Impul, and returned to championship form by winning three races at Sugo, Suzuka, and in the penultimate round at Motegi, a win which clinched his fourth Formula Nippon championship, ahead of his Impul teammate Yuji Ide. Motoyama remained with Impul in 2006, but failed to win a race for the first time since 1997 as he finished fifth in the championship with four podiums. Motoyama returned to winning form in 2007, winning all three of the season's races held at Suzuka Circuit. His victory in the final round at Suzuka was the 27th win of his Formula Nippon career, and it would turn out to be his last.

Motoyama returned to Team Le Mans, the team for whom he won his first championship, for the 2008 season. He finished eleventh in the championship, with one podium finish in the second leg of a double-header round at Suzuka. On February 18, 2009, Motoyama announced on his website that he would not race in the 2009 Formula Nippon Championship, bringing an end to his career in Japanese top formula racing. Nearly nine years after his final race, Motoyama tested the Dallara SF14 at Sportsland Sugo on September 27, 2017. In March 2018, Motoyama became the team director of B-Max Racing Team in the Super Formula Championship.

His four championships, 27 wins, and 21 pole positions are the most of any driver in the Formula Nippon/Super Formula era from 1996 to the present day. In the overall history of Japanese Top Formula racing, dating back to the inaugural 1973 All-Japan Formula 2000 Championship, Motoyama is second all-time in career victories to Kazuyoshi Hoshino, who won 39 races from 1974 to 1996.

Return to racing (2019-present) 
Motoyama remained semi-active in racing after retiring from GT500 driving duties. He took part in the 2019 Super Taikyu Fuji Super TEC 24 Hours, driving a customer Nissan GT-R NISMO GT3 for Tairoku Racing with B-Max Engineering, and finished 2nd overall. Motoyama was expected to enter that year's Intercontinental GT Challenge Suzuka 10 Hours later that year, but health issues forced team president Tairoku Yamaguchi to suspend his team's operations for the rest of 2019. Motoyama was expected to return to the team for the 2020 Super Taikyu Series, but their entry was suspended due to complications caused by the COVID-19 pandemic.

In December 2020, Motoyama returned to single-seater racing, competing in the final round of the Formula Regional Japanese Championship at Autopolis in a car entered by Team Goh Motorsports. He entered the final round of the Super Formula Lights Championship at Fuji Speedway, driving for B-Max Racing. This marked Motoyama's return to the second tier of Japanese single-seater racing for the first time since 1995.

On 30 January, 2021, Motoyama announced that he would return to full-time Super GT competition in the GT300 class. Motoyama partnered with Team LeMans, the team for whom he won his first Formula Nippon Championship, to form Team LeMans with Motoyama Racing. The team fielded an Audi R8 LMS GT3 Evo for himself and former All-Japan Formula 3 National Class Champion, Yoshiaki Katayama. Team LeMans with Motoyama Racing recorded a best finish of 12th at Suzuka Circuit in 2021.

24 Hours of Le Mans 
Motoyama has competed at the 24 Hours of Le Mans four times, making his debut in 1998 with NISMO and Tom Walkinshaw Racing in one of four factory Nissan R390 GT1s. Motoyama, Masami Kageyama, and Takuya Kurosawa drove the #33 JOMO R390 GT1 to a tenth-place overall finish, ninth in the GT1 category. Motoyama returned the following year in 1999 with NISMO, driving the new Nissan R391 Le Mans prototype. Motoyama and co-drivers Érik Comas and Michael Krumm ran as high as fourth place overall in the #22 R391, before retiring after 110 laps with an electrical issue.

After thirteen years away from Le Mans, Motoyama made his return in 2012, driving the Nissan-powered DeltaWing experimental prototype for Highcroft Racing alongside Krumm and Marino Franchitti. With six hours elapsed in the race, Motoyama was racing in heavy traffic after a safety car restart when he was hit by the Toyota TS030 Hybrid of Kazuki Nakajima in the Porsche Curves, sending him crashing into the concrete barriers. In one of the race's most memorable moments, Motoyama spent two hours trying to repair the DeltaWing, as his Nissan mechanics stood behind the spectator fencing to give instructions. Ultimately, he was forced to abandon the car and retire from the race.

Motoyama's last Le Mans outing to date was in 2014, driving yet another Nissan experimental vehicle, the all-electric ZEOD RC, with Nissan GT Academy graduates Lucas Ordoñez and Wolfgang Reip. Shortly after the ZEOD completed the first all-electric lap at the Circuit de la Sarthe, the car was forced to retire after just five laps.

Formula One 
After becoming JGTC and Formula Nippon champion in 2003, and motivated after the death of his childhood friend Daijiro Kato, Motoyama began to pursue opportunities to race in the Formula One World Championship. On October 10, 2003, Motoyama was given a Friday test drive for the Jordan F1 Team prior to the Japanese Grand Prix at Suzuka Circuit. On December 10, 2003, Motoyama was given a chance to test with the Renault F1 Team at Circuito de Jerez in Spain. He completed 69 laps and was only two seconds off the fastest lap recorded by Renault ace driver Fernando Alonso.

Ultimately, Motoyama was unable to secure a drive for the 2004 season, and soon thereafter abandoned his pursuit of a Formula One drive.

Other series 
In 1999, Motoyama won the Le Mans Fuji 1000km at Fuji Speedway, driving the same Nissan R391 that he competed with at Le Mans that year.

Motoyama has competed in the Super Taikyu Series (formerly the N1 Endurance Series), most recently in 2017 as the owner and driver of SKT Team Motoyama, fielding a Nissan Fairlady Z34 in the ST-3 class.

Racing record

Complete Japanese Touring Car Championship (1994-) results
(key) (Races in bold indicate pole position) (Races in italics indicate fastest lap)

Complete JGTC/Super GT Results
(key) (Races in bold indicate pole position) (Races in italics indicate fastest lap)

Complete Formula Nippon results
(key) (Races in bold indicate pole position) (Races in italics indicate fastest lap)

Complete Formula One participations
(key)

Complete 24 Hours of Le Mans results

Sources
Speedsport Magazine Race Driver Database

References

External links

 
Super GT Official website

1971 births
Living people
People from Tokyo
Japanese racing drivers
Formula Nippon drivers
Japanese Formula 3 Championship drivers
Super GT drivers
24 Hours of Le Mans drivers
Japanese Touring Car Championship drivers
Formula Regional Japanese Championship drivers
Team LeMans drivers
Nismo drivers
Team Aguri drivers
Highcroft Racing drivers
B-Max Racing drivers